The Lyttelton Harbour Board was established on 10 January 1877 to manage Lyttelton Harbour. The harbour had previously been managed by the Canterbury Provincial Council, but provincial government ceased to exist on 1 January 1877. The harbour board was governed by members elected during local elections. Lyttelton Harbour Board was disestablished through the 1989 local government reforms, with its functions transferred to the Lyttelton Port Company.

The Lyttelton Harbour Board held its first meeting on 18 January 1877. The ten inaugural members were Edward Richardson, John Hall, Hugh Murray-Aynsley, Peter Cunningham, Richard James Strachan Harman, David Craig, John Anderson, Edward George Wright, Henry Sawtell, and John T. Rouse. Richardson was unanimously elected as the inaugural chairman. The table below shows the original membership of the harbour board:

Cunningham resigned in late 1877 and was replaced by Charles Wesley Turner, the deputy chair of the Canterbury Chamber of Commerce. Harry Allwright was elected mayor of Lyttelton in December 1877 and thus replaced Rouse. Both attended their first meeting in December 1877.

List of chairman

The Lyttelton Harbour Board had the following chairmen:

Notes

References

Politics of Canterbury, New Zealand
Port authorities in New Zealand